Richard Hamilton (born 9 January 1967) is a Jamaican boxer. He competed in the men's welterweight event at the 1988 Summer Olympics.

References

External links
 

1967 births
Living people
Jamaican male boxers
Olympic boxers of Jamaica
Boxers at the 1988 Summer Olympics
Competitors at the 1986 Central American and Caribbean Games
Place of birth missing (living people)
Welterweight boxers
20th-century Jamaican people